The People's Commissariat of Heavy Industry (Narkomtiazhprom) was a government ministry in the Soviet Union in 1930s.

Brief overview
The People's Commissariat of Heavy Industry, known by the acronym NKTP, was founded in 1932 out of the Supreme Soviet of the National Economy and was responsible for all heavy industrial goods, including mining, machinery and defense goods.

The defense industry assets were separated in December 1936, with the creation of the People's Commissariat of the Defense Industry, and in August 1937 there was set up the People's Commissariat for Mechanical Engineering. In early 1939 the NKTP was divided into six separate commissariats.

Succeeding commissariats
 People's Commissariat of the Defense Industry
 People's Commissariat for Mechanical Engineering
 People's Commissariat of Fuel Industry
 People's Commissariat of Ferrous Metallurgy
 People's Commissariat of Non-Ferrous Metallurgy
 People's Commissariat of Power Plants and Power Generating Industry
 People's Commissariat of Chemical Industry
 People's Commissariat of Construction Materials Industry

List of people's commissars (ministers)
Source:
 Sergo Ordzhonikidze (5.1.1932 - 25.2.1937)
 Valery Mezhlauk (25.2.1937 - 23.8.1937)
 Lazar Kaganovich (23.8.1937 - 24.1.1939)

Research institutes
Organisations they took responsibility for include:
 Leningrad Military Mechanical Institute
 Kharkiv Institute of Physics and Technology
 Reactive Scientific Research Institute

See also
 Narkomtiazhprom Building

References